Scopula penultima is a moth of the  family Geometridae. It is found in Africa.

References

Moths described in 1992
penultima
Moths of Africa